Rubén Acosta (born 4 April 1934) is a Mexican sports administrator who was the president of the Fédération Internationale de Volleyball (FIVB) from 1984 to 2008. In 1988, he was a recipient of the Silver Olympic Order.

References

External links
 

1934 births
Living people
Mexican sports executives and administrators
Recipients of the Olympic Order